The Maroggia Tunnel is a railway tunnel in the Swiss canton of Ticino. The tunnel is situated on the eastern bank of Lake Lugano, between Bissone and Maroggia. It forms part of the Swiss Federal Railways Gotthard line, which links Lugano and the north of Switzerland with Chiasso and Italy, between the Melide causeway and Maroggia-Melano station.

The Maroggia Tunnel is paralleled by the San Nicolao Tunnel, carrying the A2 motorway through the same lakeside promontory.

References 

Transport in Ticino
Railway tunnels in Switzerland